Ellerslie is an unincorporated community and census-designated place (CDP) in Allegany County, Maryland, United States. As of the 2010 census it had a population of 572. Ellerslie is part of the Cumberland, MD-WV Metropolitan Statistical Area.

The community is named for Elderslie, Scotland, the birthplace of Scottish hero William Wallace.

History
In the early twentieth century, Ellerslie contained a planing mill and a Standard Oil Company pumping station.

Geography
The town is situated in the valley of Wills Creek, between the parallel ridges of Little Allegheny Mountain to the west and Wills Mountain to the east.

Demographics

References

External links
Ellerslie Volunteer Fire Company
Ellerslie Information and History

Census-designated places in Allegany County, Maryland
Census-designated places in Maryland
Populated places in the Cumberland, MD-WV MSA
Cumberland, MD-WV MSA